CGG may refer to:

CGG (company), a multi-national geophysical services company, formerly known as CGGVeritas
 Compagnie Générale de Géophysique, a geophysical services company that merged to form CGGVeritas in early 2007
The Canadian Grenadier Guards, infantry regiment of Canada's military reserve force
Church of the Great God
Campaign for Good Governance in Sierra Leone
 Kiga language, ISO-639 language code
 A codon for the amino acid arginine
 CGG trinucleotide repeat disorder, which causes Fragile X syndrome